This is the list of all FK Vardar's European matches.

Summary

By competition

Source: UEFA.com, Last updated on 19 July 2018Pld = Matches played; W = Matches won; D = Matches drawn; L = Matches lost; GF = Goals for; GA = Goals against. Defunct competitions indicated in italics.

Results

Player records 
Most appearances in UEFA club competitions: 21 appearances
Muarem Zekir
Top scorers in UEFA club competitions: 13 goals
Wandeir Oliveira dos Santos

UEFA club coefficient ranking

Current
(As of 19 April 2017), Source:

Rankings since 1999

Source:

References

Europe
Vardar
Vardar in Europe
Vardar